David Garmston is an English journalist who currently works as a presenter on BBC Points West and Sunday Politics West. He has worked in television in the West Country for nearly three decades.

Biography 
Garmston was born in Bristol and attended Cotham Grammar School. He began his career appearing in several films in Bristol and the West, whilst training as a journalist with the weekly Sevenoaks Chronicle and the evening newspaper, The Gloucestershire Echo. Once qualified by the NCTJ (coming joint top in the UK) he joined the new independent radio station for Bristol and Bath, Radio West.

Garmston has, since 1985, been the male anchor on BBC Points West, working alongside Alex Lovell, Amanda Parr and Imogen Sellers. On Sundays, he presents the regional opt-out of Sunday Politics, Sunday Politics West.
Garmston plays second Cornet with a local brass band. He has featured in The Bristol evening Post Jan 10th  1997 with the band.

References

Living people
Year of birth missing (living people)
Journalists from Bristol
English television journalists